WJGM (105.7 MHz) is a non-profit FM radio station licensed to Baldwin, Florida, and serving the Jacksonville metropolitan area.  The station is currently owned by the West Jacksonville Baptist Church, Inc.  Studios and offices are on Normandy Boulevard in Jacksonville.  The transmitter is off Boyd Road in Bryceville, Florida.

WJGM airs a mix of Southern gospel music with some Christian talk and teaching programs on weekdays.  It holds periodic fundraisers on the air to seek donations.

History
The station went on the air as WUFC on July 30, 1992. It was owned by Peaches Broadcasting, Ltd.  On October 16, 1992, the station changed its call sign to WXQL.  In June 2011, the station was purchased by the West Jacksonville Baptist Church, and the call sign was changed to WJGM.

References

External links

Radio stations established in 1992
1992 establishments in Florida
Southern Gospel radio stations in the United States
JGM